Charlotte Bilbault (born 5 June 1990) is a French footballer who plays for Division 1 Féminine club Montpellier and the France national team. She is a former graduate of the women's section of the Clairefontaine academy and plays as a defensive midfielder.

Bilbault joined her current club ahead of the 2010–11 season after one season with first division club Nord Allier Yzeure. She is a former women's youth international for France having represented her nation at under-17, under-19, and under-20 level. Bilbault featured with the under-20 teams that played at the 2008 and 2010 editions of the FIFA U-20 Women's World Cup.

Career statistics

International

Scores and results list France's goal tally first, score column indicates score after each Bilbault goal.

Notes

References

External links
 
 
  
  
 Player French football stats at footofeminin.fr 
 
 

1990 births
Living people
French women's footballers
France women's youth international footballers
France women's international footballers
Montpellier HSC (women) players
CNFE Clairefontaine players
ASJ Soyaux-Charente players
Paris FC (women) players
Division 1 Féminine players
Women's association football midfielders
2019 FIFA Women's World Cup players
FC Girondins de Bordeaux (women) players
Sportspeople from Cher (department)
Footballers from Centre-Val de Loire
UEFA Women's Euro 2022 players